Robert Eriksson (born 7 September 1971) is a former professional tennis player from Sweden.

Eriksson lost in the opening round of the 1994 US Open to Andre Agassi, who went on to win the tournament.

References

1971 births
Living people
Swedish male tennis players